Ancylosis eremicola is a species of snout moth in the genus Ancylosis. It was described by Hans Georg Amsel in 1935, and is known from Israel.

References

Moths described in 1935
eremicola
Moths of Asia